Rudraksha refers to a stonefruit, the dried stones of which are used as prayer beads by Hindus (especially Shaivas), as well as by Buddhists and Sikhs. When they are ripe, rudraksha stones are covered by an inedible blue outer fruit so they are sometimes called "blueberry beads". The rudraksha stones are produced by several species of large, evergreen, broad-leaved tree in the genus Elaeocarpus, the principal species of which is  Elaeocarpus ganitrus.

The stones are associated with the Hindu deity Shiva and are commonly worn for protection and for chanting mantras such as Om Namah Shivaya. The stones are primarily sourced from India, Indonesia, and Nepal for jewellery and malas (garlands); they are valued similarly to semi-precious stones. Various meanings and interpretations are attributed to rudraksha stones with different numbers of "faces" or locules, and rare or unique stones are highly prized and valued.

Etymology 
Rudra is one of Shiva's names.

Sanskrit dictionaries translate  as eyes, as do many prominent Hindus such as Sivaya Subramuniyaswami and Kamal Narayan Seetha; accordingly, rudraksha may be interpreted as meaning "eyes of Rudra".

Description

Rudraksha tree 

Of the 300 species of Elaeocarpus, 35 are found in India. The principal species of this genus is Elaeocarpus ganitrus, which has the common name of "rudraksha tree", and is found from the Gangetic plain in the foothills of the Himalayas to Nepal, South and Southeast Asia, parts of Australia, Guam, and Hawaii.

They are evergreen trees which grow quickly, and as they mature their roots form buttresses, rising up near the trunk and radiating out along the surface of the ground.

Fruit 

The rudraksha tree starts bearing drupes (fruit) in three to four years from germination. It yields between 1,000 and 2,000 fruits annually. These fruits are commonly called "rudraksha fruit", but are also known as amritaphala (fruits of ambrosia).

The pyrena of the fruit, commonly called the "pit" or "stone", is typically divided into multiple segments by seed-bearing locules. When the fruit is fully ripe, the stones are covered with a blue outer fleshy husk of inedible fruit. The blue colour is not derived from a pigment but is due to structural colouration. Rudraksha beads are sometimes called "blueberry beads" in reference to the blue colour of the fruit.

Chemical composition 
Rudraksha fruits contain alkaloids, flavonoids, tannins, steroids, triterpenes, carbohydrates, and cardiac glycosides. They also contain rudrakine, an alkaloid which had been discovered in rudraksha fruit in 1979.

Types of rudraksha stones 

Rudraksha stones are described as having a number of facets or "faces" (mukhi) which are separated by a line or cleft along the stone. Stones typically have between 1 and 21 faces, although most have between 4 and 6 faces. Those with a single face are the rarest. Rudraksha stones are most often brown, although white, red, yellow, or black stones may also be found.

Many types of stone are described. Gauri shankar are two stones which are naturally conjoined. Sawar are gauri shankar in which one of the conjoined stones has just one face. Ganesha are stones which have a trunk-like protrusion on their bodies. Trijuti are three stones which are naturally conjoined. Other rare types include veda (4 conjoined sawars) and dwaita (2 conjoined sawars).

Uses

Religious uses in Indian-origin religions 

Rudraksha stones may be strung together as beads on a garland which can be worn around the neck. The beads are commonly strung on silk, or on a black or red cotton thread. Less often, jewellers use copper, silver or gold wires. The rudraksha beads may be damaged if strung too tightly. The Devi-Bhagavata Purana describes the preparation of rudraksha garlands.

Hindus often use rudraksha garlands aids to prayer and meditation, and to sanctify the mind, body, and soul, much as Christians use prayer beads and rosaries to count repetitions of prayer. There is a long tradition of wearing 108 rudraksha beads in India, particularly within Shaivism, due to their association with Shiva, who wears rudraksha garlands. Most garlands contain 108 beads plus one because as 108 is considered sacred and a suitable number of times to recite a short mantra. The extra bead, which is called the "Meru", or "guru bead", helps mark the beginning and end of a cycle of 108 and has symbolic value as a 'principle' bead. Rudraksha garlands usually contain beads in combinations 27+1, 54+1, or 108+1. The mantra Om Namah Shivaya, associated with Shiva, is often chosen for repetitions (japa) using rudraksha beads.

History

In Hindu religious texts

Upanishads 
Several late-medieval Upanishads describe the construction, wearing, and use rudraksha garlands as well as their mythological origin as the tears of Rudra.

Tirumurai 
Like the Upanishads, the Tirumurai describes the wearing of rudraksha garlands and their use as prayer beads for chanting mantras. Accordingly, the Tirumurai identifies wearing a pair of rudraksha garlands as a sign of piety.

Cultivation

Herbal and sacred groves 

Ch. Devi Lal Rudraksha Vatika, is a  grove dedicated to rudraksha which also has over 400 endangered ayurvedic medicinal herbs in Yamunanagar district of Haryana state in India.

Rudraksha is primarily cultivated in the foothills of the Himalayas, mainly in Nepal and India.  The most popular varieties of Rudraksha are found in the regions of Kathmandu, Kulu, and Rameshwaram in India.

Groves are mostly found in Uttarakhand state of India.

Gallery

Tree

Fruit

Stones

See also

Notes

References 

Plants in Hinduism
Prayer beads
Decorative fruits and seeds
Rudraksha
Plants used in Ayurveda
Articles containing video clips

pl:Mala wąskolistna